was a Japanese nuclear physicist and politician, known for the interacting boson model.

Personal life
Arima was born 1930 in Osaka. He studied at the University of Tokyo, where he received his doctorate in 1958. He became a research associate at the Institute for Nuclear Studies in 1956.

Arima died on December 7, 2020 at the age of 90.

Career
Arima became a lecturer in 1960, and an associate professor at the Department of Physics in 1964 at the University of Tokyo. He was promoted to a full professor in 1975. He was president of the University of Tokyo during 1989–1993. In 1993, he moved to Hosei University. Since 1993, he has been scientific adviser of the Ministry of Education and from 1993 to 1998 president of RIKEN.

He was a visiting professor at Rutgers University, New Jersey (1967–1968), and a professor at the State University of New York at Stony Brook (1971–1973). In 1974, he founded the interacting boson model with Francesco Iachello.

In 1998 he entered the Diet of Japan as a member of the House of Councillors for the Liberal Democratic Party. He was Minister of Education until 1999 under the government of Keizo Obuchi. After the cabinet reshuffle in 1999, he served as Director of the Science Museum. From 2000 he was chairman of the Japan Science Foundation.

Arima has served as the Chancellor of Musashi Academy of the Nezu Foundation since 2006.

Awards and honors
 Nishina Memorial Prize (1978)
 Honorary Professor, the University of Glasgow (1984)
 Humboldt Award (1987)
 Haiku Society Prize for a book of poetry (haiku poems) (1988)
 John Price Wetherill Medal of the Franklin Institute (1990)
 Grand Cross of the Order of Merit of the Federal Republic of Germany (1990)
 Military William Order (1991)
 Honorary Doctor, Drexel University (1992)
 Honorary Professor, the University of Science and Technology, China (1992)
 Honorary Doctor, Chung Yuan Christian University, Taiwan (1992)
 Bonner Prize of the American Physical Society (1993)
 Japan Academy Prize (1993)
 Honorary Doctor, the State University of New York at Stony Brook (1994)
 Honorary Doctor, the University of Groningen (1994)
 Honorary Doctor, the University of Birmingham (1996)
 Grand Officier of the Legion of Honour (1998)
 Foreign Honorary Member of the American Academy of Arts and Sciences (1999)
Honorary Knight Commander of the Order of the British Empire (KBE) (2002)
Person of Cultural Merit (2004)
Grand Cordon of the Order of the Rising Sun (2004)
Order of Culture (2010)

References

External links

1930 births
2020 deaths
Commanders Crosses of the Order of Merit of the Federal Republic of Germany
Education ministers of Japan
Fellows of the American Academy of Arts and Sciences
Grand Cordons of the Order of the Rising Sun
Grand Officiers of the Légion d'honneur
Honorary Knights Commander of the Order of the British Empire
20th-century Japanese physicists
Japanese nuclear physicists
Mathematical physicists
Members of the House of Councillors (Japan)
People from Osaka Prefecture
Presidents of the University of Tokyo
Riken personnel
Recipients of the Order of Culture
Theoretical physicists
University of Tokyo alumni
Academic staff of the University of Tokyo
Politicians from Osaka Prefecture
Presidents of the Physical Society of Japan
Presidents of The Japan Association of National Universities